In the Church of Jesus Christ of Latter-day Saints (LDS Church), a temple is a building dedicated to be a House of the Lord. Temples are considered by church members to be the most sacred structures on earth.

 At present, there are temples in many U.S. states, as well as in many countries across every populated continent of the world.

North America

Canada

United States

Mexico

Central America and the Caribbean

South America

Europe

Africa
For many years, the only temple was the Johannesburg South Africa Temple. Now there are several across the continent, with Africa being one of the fastest-growing areas of the church.

Asia

Oceania

See also
 List of temples of The Church of Jesus Christ of Latter-day Saints
 Comparison of temples of The Church of Jesus Christ of Latter-day Saints
 Temple architecture (LDS Church)

Notes



Temples, geographical
Temples of The Church of Jesus Christ of Latter-day Saints